Miyan Velayat District is a district (bakhsh) in Taybad County, Razavi Khorasan Province, Iran. At the 2006 census, its population was 27,236, in 5,863 families.  The District has one city: Mashhad Rizeh. The District has two rural districts (dehestan): Dasht-e Taybad Rural District and Kuhsangi Rural District.

References 

Districts of Razavi Khorasan Province
Taybad County